Ariannis Vichy Saladre (born 18 May 1989 in Santiago de Cuba) is a Cuban hammer thrower. She competed in the hammer throw event at the 2012 Summer Olympics.

Personal bests
Hammer throw: 71.50 m –  La Habana, 29 June 2012

Competition record

References

External links

Sports reference biography

Sportspeople from Santiago de Cuba
Cuban female hammer throwers
1989 births
Living people
Olympic athletes of Cuba
Athletes (track and field) at the 2012 Summer Olympics
Pan American Games competitors for Cuba
Athletes (track and field) at the 2015 Pan American Games
21st-century Cuban women